Damage Done is a 2002 album by Dark Tranquillity.

Damage Done may also refer to:

 Damage Done (novel), a 2010 novel by Hilary Davidson
 "Damage Done", a 2016 song by Kita Alexander

See also
 The Damage Done (disambiguation)